G̃ or g̃ is the letter G with a tilde.

G̃ or g̃ may also mean:

 g̃, a gluino
 G̃, a gravitino